is a 1951 Japanese drama film directed by Mikio Naruse. It is based on a novel by Tomoichirō Inoue.

Plot
Ginza Cosmetics follows the life of hostess Yukiko, single mother of a young boy, in the lively Tokyo quarter of Ginza.

Cast
Kinuyo Tanaka as Yukiko Tsuji
Ranko Hanai as Shizue Sayama
Kyōko Kagawa as Kyōko
Eijirō Yanagi as Seikichi Kineya
Eijirō Tōno as Hyōbei Sugano
Yoshihiro Nishikubo as Haruo

References

External links

1951 films
1951 drama films
Japanese drama films
1950s Japanese-language films
Japanese black-and-white films
Films based on Japanese novels
Films directed by Mikio Naruse
Shintoho films
1950s Japanese films